Harold Joseph Steele was Archdeacon of Waitemata from 1965 until 1972.

Steele was educated at St John's College, Auckland and ordained in 1936. After a curacy at Remuera he held incumbencies in Auckland, Waimate, Papatoetoe and Mount Eden.

References

People educated at St John's College, Auckland
Archdeacons of Waitemata